Vostok refers to east in Russian but may also refer to:

Spaceflight
 Vostok programme, Soviet human spaceflight project
 Vostok (spacecraft), a type of spacecraft built by the Soviet Union
 Vostok (rocket family), family of rockets derived from the Soviet R-7 Semyorka ICBM designed for the human spaceflight programme
 Vostok (crater),  a crater explored by the Mars rover Opportunity
 Vostok 1, the first human spaceflight

Places
 Vostok Island, located in the south of Kiribati's Line Islands
 Uschod (Minsk Metro) (Russian name Vostok), a station of Minsk Metro, Minsk, Belarus
 Vostok Rupes, a mountain chain on planet Mercury

Antarctica
 Cape Vostok, the west extremity of the Havre Mountains and the northwest extremity of Alexander Island
 Vostok Station, Russian (originally Soviet) Antarctic research station
 Lake Vostok, a subglacial lake located beneath Vostok Station
 Vostok Subglacial Highlands, an east extension of Gamburtsev Subglacial Mountains

Russia
 Vostok (inhabited locality), several inhabited localities
 Vostok Bay, bay in south Primorsky Krai

Organizations
 Vostok watches, a brand of watch made in Chistopol, Tatarstan, Russia
 Vostok motorcycles, a motorcycle company, participant in 1965 Grand Prix motorcycle racing season
 Vostok Gas, a Bermuda-based oil and gas investment company
 Vostok Games, a Ukrainian game developer
 Special Battalion Vostok, a Chechen military unit

Sport
 Vostok Arsenyev, a Russian bandy club
 FC Vostok, a Kazakhstani football club

Fictional entities
 Valentina Vostok, a fictional comic book character appearing in books published by DC Comics
 Vostok, a member of the fictional superhero team Soviet Super-Soldiers, which appears in Marvel Comics
 Vostok-X, a member of the fictional superhero team Aquaman and the Others, which appears in DC Comics

Other uses
 Vostok (sloop-of-war), an 1818 ship of Faddey Bellingshausen during the First Russian Antarctic Expedition
 Vostok traverse, a 1962 Australian expedition across Antarctica
 Exercise Vostok, Russian military exercises, similar to Exercise Zapad

See also
 Vostok Battalion (disambiguation)